Song Wenyan (born 9 April 1992) is a Chinese swimmer. She competed for China at the 2012 Summer Olympics.

See also
China at the 2012 Summer Olympics - Swimming

References

1992 births
Living people
Chinese female freestyle swimmers
Swimmers from Shandong
Swimmers at the 2012 Summer Olympics
Olympic swimmers of China
Place of birth missing (living people)
21st-century Chinese women